The Trials of Muhammad Ali is a 2013 American documentary about the heyday of boxer Muhammad Ali's career, with special focus on his conversion to Islam and his refusal to fight in the Vietnam War. It won an award for Best Use of News Footage from the International Documentary Association in 2014.

Cast
Interviewees:
 Louis Farrakhan
 Robert Lipsyte
 John Carlos
 Angelo Dundee

Archive footage:
 Muhammad Ali
 George W. Bush
 David Susskind
 Lyndon Johnson
 Jerry Lewis
 Malcolm X
 Martin Luther King Jr.
 Elijah Muhammad

References

External links
 

2013 films
Kartemquin Films films
Films about Muhammad Ali
2010s English-language films
2010s American films